The Ellen MacArthur Cancer Trust is a registered charity that supports young people aged 8–24 to rebuild their confidence after cancer.

For many young people simply picking up where they left off before their diagnosis isn't possible. Through a range of sailing and adventure trips, young people rediscover the confidence to positively embrace their futures. The impact of cancer on independence, education, employment, emotional wellbeing and a young person's relationships with friends and family is huge. Many young people are also left living with a range of long-term physical effects.

The charity has bases in Cowes on the Isle of Wight and Largs on Scotland's West Coast. The organisation receives no government support and all the activities it offers are free.

History 
In 2000 Dame Ellen MacArthur DBE sailed with A Chacun Son Cap, a French charity for children with cancer and leukaemia. Inspired by the incredible impact sailing had on helping those children rediscover themselves in the confusing aftermath of cancer, and by their courage, spirit and humour, Ellen launched the 'Ellen MacArthur Trust' for young people aged 8–18 in Cowes in 2003.

The inaugural Trust trip sailed out of Cowes on 20 July 2003, with five young people from Great Ormond Street Hospital. The following week a group from Southampton General Hospital sailed too.

In 2005, the Trust was named an official charity of the Round the Island Race and first Trust crew took part in the iconic race. This was significant as it was the first time that young people, who had previously sailed with the Trust in recovery from cancer, were invited back.

Young people being able to return year-on-year would become a core element of the Trust providing long-term support, not just one-off trip experiences, and in 2007, Essex Outdoors Bradwell hosted the Trust's first residential adventure activities trip as part of what became known as the 'Return to Sail' programme.

A name change to the 'Ellen MacArthur Cancer Trust' followed in 2010, the same year that the charity started to support young people aged 18–24 for the first time. This was important because young people in this older age group face different challenges to children after treatment.

With the Trust now working with every young person's principal treatment centre in the UK, a second base in Largs was opened in 2013, thanks to the support of players of People's Postcode Lottery. By 2019, no fewer than 2,400 young people from across England, Scotland, Wales and Northern Ireland had been supported in rebuilding their confidence after cancer.

Impact 
The Trust has three priority outcomes for young people:

 Regaining Confidence - overcoming the struggle to maintain a sense of personal worth to regain control over life and feel happy and secure.
 Ability to plan for the future - progressing beyond reliance on parents/carers, through survivors' guilt, to realise the confidence to consider life's next chapter.
 Get back into education or employment - breaking perceived barriers to success in education and employment.

The young people have fun, they adventure together and achieve, overcoming their fears, changing their self-perception and feeling important, and because they socialise with others like them they feel like they belong, are more positive, don't feel judged, feel their anxiety reduce and start to think differently about themselves and what they are capable of.

As a result, young people are more...

 Happy - young people experience a positive change in perspective on their illness and life. Fun is important, the trips are life changing and an escape from daily life. 91% of parents say their child is happier.
 Confident - confidence is enhanced through a new awareness of abilities and a change in self-perception with feelings of self-assurance and self-belief. Over 92% of young people say they are more confident.
 Independent - parents observe children being happy away from home and family and doing things on their own. Young people get a sense of normality and not feeling different. Over 95% of parents say their child gained independence.

References

External links

Charities based on the Isle of Wight
Cancer organisations based in the United Kingdom
Sailing in the United Kingdom
2003 establishments in England
Organizations established in 2003